The 2014 Ealing Council election took place on 22 May 2014 to elect members of Ealing Council in London. This was on the same day as other local elections.  The Labour Party retained overall control of the council, increasing their majority over the Conservative Party by 13 seats.

Background
The last election in 2010 saw Labour winning a majority with 40 seats, compared to 24 for the Conservatives and 5 for the Liberal Democrats.  However, in the intervening period between elections, some councillors changed allegiance.  The Labour Party was led locally by Julian Bell, a Councillor since 2002, while the Conservative Party was led by David Milican, Councillor from 1990 to 1994 and then from 2006 to 2014 and the Liberal Democrats were led by Gary Malcom, who had been a Councillor since 2002.

Election Result
Labour maintained control with an increased majority, winning 53 out of 69 seats on the council.  The Conservatives fell to 12 seats, while the Liberal Democrats took the remaining four seats.

Following the result, Conservative leader David Milican resigned, and local leadership was taken up by Gregory Stafford, Councillor since 2007.

Summary of results

Wards and Results

Detailed Results

Acton Central

Cleveland

Dormers Wells

Ealing Broadway

Ealing Common

East Acton

Elthorne

Greenford Broadway

Greenford Green

Hanger Hill

Hobbayne

Lady Margaret

North Greenford

Northfield

Northolt Mandeville

Northolt West End

Norwood Green

Perivale

South Acton

Southall Broadway

Southall Green

Southfield

Walpole

References

Ealing
2014